The Strangler's Wife is a soundtrack album by Cul de Sac, released on October 21, 2003 through Strange Attractors Audio House.

Track listing

Personnel 
Cul de Sac
Robin Amos – Eml 101 synthesizer, keyboards
Glenn Jones – electric guitar, acoustic guitar
Jonathan LaMaster – violin, bass guitar, bağlama, harp
Jon Proudman – drums
Jake Trussell – turntables, sampler, melodica, bağlama, drums
Production and additional personnel
Cul de Sac – production
Colin Decker – mastering
Jon Williams – guitar, recording

References 

2003 soundtrack albums
Cul de Sac (band) albums